The 2022 Northeast Conference baseball tournament will begin on May 26 and end on May 29 at Senator Thomas J. Dodd Memorial Stadium in Norwich, Connecticut.  The league's top four teams finishers will compete in the double elimination tournament.  The tournament winner will earn the Northeast Conference's automatic bid to the 2022 NCAA Division I baseball tournament.  Central Connecticut has won the most tournament championships among current members, while Fairleigh Dickinson has never won a championship.  LIU Brooklyn won their first title in 2018.

Seeding and format
The top four finishers were to be seeded one through four based on conference regular season winning percentage.  They will then play a double-elimination tournament.

Bracket

References

Tournament
Northeast Conference Baseball Tournament
Northeast Conference baseball tournament